Prunus cercocarpifolia is a species of Prunus found in the Chihuahuan Desert, in the south of the Mexican state of Coahuila. Judging from its morphology, it is closely related to Prunus microphylla. When initially collected, Eupelmid wasps were found within the pits.

References

cercocarpifolia
Flora of Coahuila
Endemic flora of Mexico
Plants described in 1989
Drought-tolerant plants